The Chief Electoral Officer, Uttar Pradesh (a.k.a. CEO, Uttar Pradesh) is the Government official responsible for supervising the preparation, revision and correction of the electoral roll and for supervising the conduct of all elections in the Indian state of Uttar Pradesh. As of 20 May, 2022 Ajay Kumar Shukla is the Chief Electoral Officer of Uttar Pradesh.

Responsibilities and functions
As defined in section 13A of the Representation of the People Act 1950 and under section 20 of the Representation of the People Act 1951, the Chief Electoral Officer is responsible for supervising the preparation, revision and correction of all electoral roll and for supervising the conduct of all elections (including Lok Sabha, Vidhan Sabha and Uttar Pradesh Legislative Council). The Chief Electoral Officer is also responsible for monitoring the election expenditure and also the Code of Conduct defined by the Election Commission of India. The Chief Electoral Officer works under the superintendence, direction and control of the Election Commission of India.

Appointment
The Chief Electoral Officer is nominated by or is designated by the Election Commission of India to perform the duties stated in the Representation of the People Act, 1950 & 1951.

See also
Election Commission of India
Sixteenth Legislative Assembly of Uttar Pradesh
States Election Commission (India)
Uttar Pradesh State Election Commission

References

External links 
 Official website of Chief Electoral Officer, Uttar Pradesh

Elections in Uttar Pradesh
Election people
Uttar Pradesh
Indian government officials
Political office-holders in Uttar Pradesh